Inuloides refers to a genus of African plants placed in the marigold tribe within the daisy family. It is now considered to be part of the genus Osteospermum.

The only known species was Inuloides tomentosa, now Osteospermum tomentosa, native to the Cape Province region of South Africa.

References 

Calenduleae
Endemic flora of South Africa
Monotypic Asteraceae genera
Historically recognized angiosperm genera